Perkinsville is a village in County Durham, in England. It is situated immediately to the north of Pelton, to the north-west of Chester-le-Street.

There are a few shops including a convenience store, a fish and chip shop and a Beauty Salon. There is also a working men's club. A pub ('The Ship') was located in the village but has been demolished with new housing being built in its place.

Perkinsville was constructed between 1858 & 1871 by Edward Moseley Perkins, who ran Birtley Iron Works & 2 local coal mines. He was succeeded by his son Charles who expanded the business but was unfortunately killed in a car crash in 1905. Perkinsville was originally laid out in a simple colliery housing style with streets named "A street" through "E Street" and a North Street, but in the 20th century there was considerable redevelopment of the village.

The village is part of the Pelton ward of Pelton Parish Council and is part of the Pelton division of Durham County Council.

Villages in County Durham